West Virginia Route 53 is an east–west state highway in northwest West Virginia. The western terminus of the route is at West Virginia Route 5 outside Elizabeth. The eastern terminus is at West Virginia Route 47 two miles (3 km) southeast of Cisco.

Major intersections

References

053
Transportation in Wirt County, West Virginia
Transportation in Ritchie County, West Virginia